Ben and Arthur is a 2002 American romantic drama film written, directed, produced, edited, scored by and starring Sam Mraovich, and distributed by Ariztical Entertainment. The film concerns a recently married gay couple who face opposition from one partner's brother, who plots to murder them after being ostracized by his church. The film was a box office bomb, having earned only $40,000 .  It is considered by some to be one of the worst movies ever made.

Plot
Ben and Arthur are a gay couple in Los Angeles, eagerly awaiting the legalization of gay marriage in Hawaii so that they may travel there for their dream wedding. After this comes true, they purchase plane tickets; however, before they leave, they discover that a challenge to the judge's ruling has resulted in a suspension of gay marriage in Hawaii, pending further judicial review. Ben takes this time to inform Arthur that he is actually already married to a woman named Tammy, whom he wed out of societal pressure before he came to terms with his sexuality, and from whom he has been separated since before he and Arthur met. Arthur becomes angry but decides to stay with Ben anyway. Shortly thereafter, Ben contacts Tammy, finally comes out to her, and asks her for a divorce.

Ben and Arthur work at a small diner, where Ben is a dishwasher and Arthur is a waiter. Although Ben—a former nurse who quit to pursue a music career—enjoys the job, Arthur has grown impatient, deciding to quit and go back to college so that he can open a sex shop. Although the loss of income means that Ben will have to quit and return to being a nurse, he agrees to do so in order to help Arthur pursue his dream. To finance his education, Arthur meets his estranged brother, Victor, whom he has not spoken to for seven years. Victor is a religious fanatic who believes that Arthur's homosexuality is a sign of demonic possession, despite being flamboyant and seemingly gay. Although Victor lashes out at Arthur for his failure to turn straight, he nonetheless offers to give Arthur money for college if he will bring Ben by the apartment and allow him to evangelize. Meanwhile, the couple hires an attorney to consult for advice on getting married. She advises that they travel to Vermont, be wed in a civil union, and then return and attempt to be recognized as members of a domestic partnership. In Vermont, the two are wed privately.

Suspicious, Victor hires a private investigator to tail Ben and Arthur and learns of their marriage. He follows the attorney home and shoots her dead. Meanwhile, Tammy visits Arthur's apartment with a gun, but Ben takes it and throws her out. Learning about their attorney's death, Ben and Arthur agree to come to Victor's apartment. Unexpectedly, Victor and another congregant from his church, Stan, outpour homophobic insults. They then secretly devise a plan to exorcise the couple using homemade holy water. The plot fails, and the couple enjoys a honeymoon in Hawaii. Victor's priest Father Rabin informs that he is being excommunicated because the congregation does not want the relative of a gay person attending church services, fearful that he will bring them bad karma and negative energy. Upon request, Stan helps Victor convince Father Rabin to undo his decision if he can murder Ben and Arthur. They hire the hitman Scott, whom Father Rabin has used to kill gay people.

Upon arrival, Ben is gay bashed by Victor and Scott; the attack hospitalizes him. Suspecting his brother's involvement, Arthur breaks into Victor's apartment and taps his phone. After intercepting a call implicating Victor and Father Rabin, Arthur goes to Victor's church, chloroforms Father Rabin, and burns the church down. When Ben recovers, Arthur takes him back home. Deciding to be more radical, Victor and Scott go to the couple's apartment with guns; at the last minute, Victor tells Scott that he wants to kill them himself and sends him away. Victor shoots Ben dead, and then forces Arthur to strip naked at gunpoint, performing an impromptu baptism in the bathtub. While Victor contemplates what he has done, Arthur slips away and gets Tammy's gun from Ben. A hysterical Arthur propositions Victor while holding him at gunpoint, accusing him of self-directed homophobia. When Arthur fires a warning shot, Victor shoots Arthur several times. In turn, Arthur manages to shoot Victor in the forehead and kill him, before Arthur dies of his own wounds.

Cast
 Sam Mraovich as Arthur Sailes
 Jamie Brett Gabel as Ben Sheets
 Michael Haboush as Victor Sailes
 Bill Hindley as Father Rabin
 Julie M. Zimmerman as Tammy Sheets (billed as Julie Belknap)
 Gina Aguilar as Attorney
 Arthur Huber as Private Investigator, Justin Abraham
 Oto Brezina as Priest
 Richard Hitchcock as Stan
 Bruce Lurie as Agent Moreen
 Buck Elkin as Bar Owner
 Nick Bennet as Scott
 Loretta Altman as Mildread
 Holly Mraovich as Grocery Lady

Production and release
Sam Mraovich assumed most of the film's production and creative duties; in addition to writing, directing, and starring in the film, he also handled cinematography duties, scored the film, and edited it. Aside from Mraovich's compositions, the film also contains public domain recordings of Scott Joplin's "The Entertainer" and Johann Pachelbel's Canon in D, which play over the opening and closing credits, respectively.

The original script featured a female antagonist named Victoria, as opposed to a male antagonist named Victor. Some of Victor's lines are still listed as belonging to "Victoria" in the film's final shooting script, although any references to her relationship with Arthur have been excised. Following the film's release, Sam Mraovich received numerous complaints that, although ostensibly a homophobe, the character of Victor is not only played by a gay actor but is portrayed as flamboyantly gay in the film. Mraovich responded by saying that the casting and direction were intentional, and meant to convey that Victor is a self-loathing gay man in the vein of James McGreevey:

The film premiered at the Sunset 5 theater in West Hollywood. It was released on Region 1 DVD in the United States in early 2003 and was rereleased on January 24, 2018, through Amazon Prime as the former is out of print and expensive to buy. , the film has only earned $40,000, making it a box office bomb.

Reception
Rotten Tomatoes' editorial staff ranked it #15 on their list of "Films So Bad They're Unmissable", stating "If Tommy Wiseau's The Room is the over-wrought, melodramatic and self-pitying heterosexual camp classic of choice, then Sam Mraovich's Ben & Arthur is its gay equivalent." Rotten Tomatoes went on to cite the poor production values and Arthur's "hissy fits", concluding that the quality of the film was so poor that "Mraovich might as well have shot his story of gay persecution and fightback on a cell phone". Pop culture review site insert-disc likewise compared it to The Room, stating "The Room was better than this. The acting, special effects, music, and writing are bad even compared to 'The Room.'" Total Film included Ben and Arthur in their list of the 66 worst films of all time. 
Netflix reviews have been also negative. One review wrote, "I rarely get angry at a movie, this is an exception."

The film also took particular criticism from the gay community: The gay pop culture site Queerty called it "the worst gay movie ever", only to later retract the "gay" qualifier and simply declare it the worst in general. The gay film review site Cinemaqueer likewise indicated that it was the worst film to have ever been featured on the site, suggesting that the film was too bad to even be parodied on Mystery Science Theater 3000.

See also
List of films considered the worst

References

External links

2002 films
2002 romantic drama films
American LGBT-related films
American romantic drama films
American independent films
Films about LGBT and Christianity
Films critical of Christianity and Christians
Gay-related films
2002 independent films
2000s English-language films
2000s American films
LGBT-related controversies in film
Casting controversies in film